Union City is a historic train station located at Union City, Randolph County, Indiana.  It was built in 1876, and is a one-story, rectangular, brick building with limestone trim.  It measures 92 feet long and has a modified hipped roof. The building features wide overhanging eaves in the Prairie School style and Stick Style / Eastlake movement influences. It was remodeled between 1925 and 1930.

It was listed on the National Register of Historic Places in 1983 as the Union City Passenger Depot.

References

Railway stations on the National Register of Historic Places in Indiana
Railway stations in the United States opened in 1913
Former New York Central Railroad stations
National Register of Historic Places in Randolph County, Indiana
Transportation buildings and structures in Randolph County, Indiana
Former railway stations in Indiana